Elias of het gevecht met de nachtegalen  (Elias, or the fight with the nightingales) is a 1991 Dutch film directed by Klaas Rusticus.

Cast
Lotte Pinoy - Hermine
Bien de Moor - Aunt Henriette
Viviane de Muynck - Aunt Zenobie
Roland Ramaekers - Uncle Augustin
Toon Brouwers - Father
Marie-Louise Conings - Housekeeper
Jimmi De Koning - Aloysius
Brikke Smets - Elias
Mia Van Roy - Mother
Cara Van Wersch - Grandmother

External links 
 

Dutch drama films
1991 films
1990s Dutch-language films